Sloppy Seconds was the second album from the country rock band Dr. Hook & the Medicine Show.  It featured some of their most popular songs, including "Freakin' at the Freakers Ball" and "The Cover of Rolling Stone."  It was noted for its "crude sense of humor."

Track listing

All songs written by Shel Silverstein.

Personnel

Music
 Ray Sawyer – lead vocals
 Dennis Locorriere – lead guitar, lead vocals
 George Cummings – steel, electric and Hawaiian guitars, backing vocals
 Rik Elswit – rhythm guitar
 Billy Francis – keyboards, backing vocals
 Jance Garfat – bass
 Jay David – drums, backing vocals

Production
David Brown – engineer
Ron Coro – art direction, design
George Engfer – engineer
Ron Haffkine – producer
Glenn Kolotkin – engineer
Mike Larner – engineer
Tom Lubin – engineer
Roy Segal – engineer
Ken Walz – photography

Charts

Certifications

References

1972 albums
Dr. Hook & the Medicine Show albums
Columbia Records albums
CBS Records albums
Albums produced by Ron Haffkine
Works by Shel Silverstein